Tegostoma flavida is a moth in the family Crambidae. It was described by Frederic Moore in 1881. It is found in the Punjab region of what was British India.

References

Odontiini
Moths described in 1881
Moths of Asia
Taxa named by Frederic Moore